Alexander Joseph Rubens, Lord of Vremdyck, Willenskerk, Ter Schriek, Liesele, Malderen and steenhuffel (died 17 February 1752, in Mechelen)
was a Flemish noble man. He was the last male heir of his grandfather.

Family 

He was one of the grand children of Peter Paul Rubens and Helena Fourment. His father Frans was married to Suzanne Charles, of noble birth. Her uncle Philippe was Knight of Jerusalem. He was widower of Catharyne Philippine van Parys, who died in 1741. He was responsible for Joannes Alexander and Fredericus Ignatius Rubens, orphans of François II Rubens, and Barbe Francisca de Claer, after his death. Alexander did not have any children. He was buried with his wife in the Saint James' church, Antwerp.

Career 
Alexander Rubens was named in 1694 by Royal command Rentmeester-generaal of the King, for Mechelen. He donated from his private fortune for the completion of the Basilica of Our Lady of Hanswijk, he donated the pulpit by private gift of 2.994 gulden. He resided in Liezele castle, bought in 1716.

Ancestors

Notes

Family of Peter Paul Rubens
Flemish nobility